Pecom 32 is an educational and/or home computer developed by Elektronska Industrija Niš of Serbia in 1985.

Specifications
 CPU: CDP 1802B 5V7 running at 5 MHz
 ROM: 16 KB, with optional 16 KB upgrade containing enhanced editor and assembler
 Primary memory: 36 KB (32 KB available to user)
 Secondary storage: cassette tape
 Display: 8-colours, text mode 24 lines with 40 characters each; pseudo-graphics mode using user-defined characters
 Sound: (probably) AY-3-8912
 I/O ports: cassette tape storage, composite and RF video, RS-232 and expansion connector

See also
 Pecom 64

External links
 Old-Computers.com
 Retrospec.sgn.net - games in audio format

Home computers
EI Niš